

Virginia Hinckley Pearce (born February 8, 1945) is an author and was a member of the Young Women General Presidency of the Church of Jesus Christ of Latter-day Saints (LDS Church) from 1992 to 1997. She is the daughter of the church's 15th president, Gordon B. Hinckley.

At the church's April 1992 general conference, Pearce was sustained as first counselor to Young Women general president Janette C. Hales. She served in this capacity until 1997, when Hales was released and replaced by Margaret D. Nadauld. Pearce is a member of the board of directors of Deseret Book, a company owned by the LDS Church.

Pearce is the author and coauthor of multiple books. In 1965, she married James R. M. Pearce (died 2009) and they had six children.

Publications
Virginia H. Pearce (2013). Extending Forgiveness (Salt Lake City: Deseret Book) 
Sheri L. Dew and Virginia H. Pearce (2012). The Beginning of Better Days: Divine Instruction to Women from the Prophet Joseph Smith (Salt Lake City: Deseret Book) 
Virginia H. Pearce (2011). Through His Eyes: Rethinking What You Believe About Yourself (Salt Lake City: Deseret Book) 
Virginia H. Pearce (2006). A Heart Like His: Making Space for God's Love in Your Life (Salt Lake City: Deseret Book) 
Virginia H. Pearce (2003). Creating Terrific Talks (Salt Lake City: Deseret Book) 
Kathleen H. Barnes and Virginia H. Pearce (2002). I Love to See the Temple (Salt Lake City: Bookcraft) 
Kathleen H. Barnes and Virginia H. Pearce (2001). Prayer Time (Salt Lake City: Bookcraft) 
Kathleen H. Barnes and Virginia H. Pearce (2000). Sacrament Time (Salt Lake City: Bookcraft) 
Virginia H. Pearce (1999). Glimpses into the Life and Heart of Marjorie Pay Hinckley (Salt Lake City: Deseret Book) 
Virginia H. Pearce (1999). Classic Talk Series: Ward and Branch Families/The Ordinary Classroom (Salt Lake City: Shadow Mountain) 
Virginia H. Pearce (1999). The Power of Remembering audio cassette. (Salt Lake City: Deseret Book) 
Kathleen H. Barnes and Virginia H. Pearce (1975). What Is a Miracle? (Salt Lake City: Deseret Book)

See also

Patricia P. Pinegar : another counselor to Hales

References
“New Young Women General Presidency Called,” Ensign, May 1992, pp. 106–07

External links
Virginia H. Pearce, The Book of Mormon, February 3, 2004, sermon delivered by Pearce at Brigham Young University–Idaho
Virginia H. Pearce, “The Ordinary Classroom—a Powerful Place for Steady and Continued Growth,” Ensign, November 1996, p. 11 : sermon delivered by Pearce at October 1996 general conference
Virginia H. Pearce, “Ward and Branch Families: Part of Heavenly Father’s Plan for Us,” Ensign, November 1993, p. 79 : sermon delivered by Pearce at October 1993 general conference
Interview with Virginia H. Pearce : from deseretbook.com

1945 births
American children's writers
American leaders of the Church of Jesus Christ of Latter-day Saints
Hinckley family
Counselors in the General Presidency of the Young Women (organization)
Living people
Writers from Salt Lake City
Latter Day Saints from Utah